Pascoal may refer to:

People
José Pascoal Jr. (born 1988), Brazilian professional racing cyclist.
Pascoal Ranieri Mazzilli (1910–1975), Brazilian politician
Pascoal Mocumbi (born 1941), the Prime Minister of Mozambique from 1994 until 2004
Hermeto Pascoal (born 1936), Brazilian composer and multi-instrumentalist

Places
Monte Pascoal, mount in the state of Bahia, Brazil

See also
Pascual (disambiguation)
Pascal (disambiguation)
Pasqual (disambiguation)
Pasquale (disambiguation)

Portuguese-language surnames